Computational human modeling is an interdisciplinary computational science that links the diverse fields of artificial intelligence, cognitive science, and computer vision with machine learning, mathematics, and cognitive psychology.

Computational human modeling emphasizes descriptions of human for A.I. research and applications.

Major topics
Research in computational human modeling can include computer vision studies on identify (face recognition), attributes (gender, age, skin color), expressions, geometry (3D face modeling, 3D body modeling), and activity (pose, gaze, actions, and social interactions).

See also
 Activity recognition
 Computational theory of mind
 Emotion recognition
 Facial recognition system
 Three-dimensional face recognition

Artificial intelligence
Humanoids
Humanoid robots
Cognitive science